Derek Hodgson may refer to:

 Derek Hodgson (priest) (1931–2007), Anglican priest
 Derek Hodgson (trade unionist) (born 1941), Welsh trade union leader
 Derek Hodgson (judge), British barrister and judge